"Love Is Blue" or "L'amour est bleu" is a song whose music was composed by André Popp and whose lyrics were written by Pierre Cour.

Love Is Blue may also refer to:
 Love Is Blue (The Dells album) (1969)
 Love Is Blue (Johnny Mathis album) (1968)
 "Love Is Blue", a 1997 song by Edward Ball from "Catholic Guilt"
 Love Is Blue, a wartime memoir by Joan Wyndham
 Love Is Blue, a set of four firearms used by the titular character in Bayonetta 2